Baspani Village (बासपानी) is one of the villages of Bandipur Rural Municipality, Tanahun District, Nepal. Baspani is very popular for its orange productions.

Populated places in Tanahun District